Espyville may refer to:

Espyville, Ohio
Espyville, Pennsylvania